, born February 19, 1992, is a Japanese professional ice hockey forward currently playing for the Oji Eagles of the Asia League.

Since 2010 he plays for the Oji Eagles. He previously played at amateur level for the Shirakaba Gakuen team. He also plays in the senior Japan national team since 2012.

References

Oji Eagle's players profile

1992 births
People from Obihiro, Hokkaido
Japanese ice hockey forwards
Living people
Oji Eagles players
Sportspeople from Hokkaido
Asian Games bronze medalists for Japan
Medalists at the 2017 Asian Winter Games
Asian Games medalists in ice hockey
Ice hockey players at the 2017 Asian Winter Games